Ocha is a genus of moths in the family Lasiocampidae. The Global Lepidoptera Names Index described it as a synonym of Nesara.

References

Lasiocampidae